Jair Díaz may refer to:

 Jair Díaz (football manager) (born 1980), Venezuelan football manager
 Jair Díaz (footballer) (born 1998), Mexican footballer

See also
 Jairo Díaz (cyclist) (born 1945), Colombian cyclist
 Jairo Díaz (born 1991), Venezuelan baseball player